Swinnerton may refer to:

People

Individuals
Alastair Swinnerton, British writer and producer
Bernadette Swinnerton, English racing cyclist
Cath Swinnerton, English racing cyclist
Charles Octavius Swinnerton Morgan, English politician, historian and antiquary
Frank Arthur Swinnerton, English novelist, critic, biographer and essayist
George Swinnerton Parker, American board game inventor and industrialist
Henry Hurd Swinnerton, British geologist
Jane Swinnerton, British field hockey player
Jimmy Swinnerton, American desert landscape painter and cartoonist
Mark Swinnerton, English musician, former member of Mansun
Matthew Swinnerton, English musician, former member of the Rakes
Peter Swinnerton-Dyer, English mathematician

Groups
Milborne-Swinnerton-Pilkington Baronets, title in the Baronetage of Nova Scotia

Things
Birch and Swinnerton-Dyer conjecture relates the rank of the abelian group of points over a number field of an elliptic curve E to the order of the zero of the associated L-function L (E, s) at s = 1

See also
Swynnerton (surname)

English-language surnames
Lists of people by surname